Ribair Rodríguez Pérez (born 4 October 1987 in Montevideo) is a Uruguayan footballer currently playing for Danubio in Uruguay.

Rodríguez previously played for Leones Negros in the Ascenso MX.

Titles
 Danubio 2004 (Uruguayan Championship)
 Danubio 2006 (Torneo Apertura)
 Danubio 2007 (Torneo Clausura)

External links
 
 
 

1987 births
Living people
Footballers from Montevideo
Uruguayan footballers
Uruguayan expatriate footballers
Danubio F.C. players
Club Atlético Tigre footballers
Club Atlético Belgrano footballers
A.C.N. Siena 1904 players
Boca Juniors footballers
Santos Laguna footballers
Leones Negros UdeG footballers
Newell's Old Boys footballers
Club Atlético River Plate (Montevideo) players
Uruguayan Primera División players
Serie A players
Argentine Primera División players
Liga MX players
Association football midfielders
Uruguayan expatriate sportspeople in Argentina
Expatriate footballers in Argentina
Uruguayan expatriate sportspeople in Italy
Expatriate footballers in Italy
Uruguayan expatriate sportspeople in Mexico
Expatriate footballers in Mexico